Kropotkinsky (masculine), Kropotkinskaya (feminine), or Kropotkinskoye (neuter) may refer to:
Kropotkinsky District, name of Kavkazsky District of Krasnodar Krai, Russia in 1924–1944
Kropotkinskoye Urban Settlement, several municipal urban settlements in Russia
Kropotkinskaya, a station of the Moscow Metro, Moscow, Russia